Joseph Grech (born 26 March 1935) is a Maltese former sports shooter. He competed at the 1960, 1968 and 1972 Summer Olympics.

References

External links
 

1935 births
Living people
Maltese male sport shooters
Olympic shooters of Malta
Shooters at the 1960 Summer Olympics
Shooters at the 1968 Summer Olympics
Shooters at the 1972 Summer Olympics
20th-century Maltese people